Archdale may refer to:

 Archdale, North Carolina, United States, a city
 Archdale (LYNX station), a light rail station in Charlotte, North Carolina
 Archdale baronets, a title in the Baronetage of the United Kingdom
 Archdale (surname)
 Archdale Parkhill (1878-1947), Australian politician
 a hamlet in Easton, New York